The Botanischer Garten der Universität Regensburg is a botanical garden maintained by the University of Regensburg on campus at Universitätsstraße 31, Regensburg, Bavaria, Germany. It comprises 4.5 hectares. The garden is open daily except Saturday in the warmer months.

The garden was established in 1977 at the southern edge of the university campus. It consists of a number of different sections, including:

 Alpine plant garden
 Aquatic plants
 Endangered plants of Bavaria
 Floodplains and swamp collection
 Geographic collection (4000 m²), containing about 800 species from the American continents, Asia, and Europe 
 Medicinal plant garden
 Oak-birch forest
 Systematic collection

The garden maintains specialist collections of the following genera: Erythronium (18 species), Polygonatum (30), indigenous Rosa (25), indigenous Rubus (70), Sorbus (30), Tricyrtis (14), and Trollius (10). Some collections are open to the public. It also contains four greenhouses (total area 450 m²) with collections of ferns, bromeliads and orchids; carnivorous plants and crops from temperate climates; rainforest plants and tropical crops; cactus and succulents.

The garden is linked with a herbarium established in 1790 by the Regensburg Botanical Society, which has been associated with the university since 1973. As of 2002 the herbarium contained 1,350 fascicles with 122,358 specimens.

See also 
 List of botanical gardens in Germany

External links 
 Botanischer Garten der Universität Regensburg
 Garden map (German)
 Hermann von Helmholtz-Zentrum entry

University of Regensburg
Botanical gardens in Germany
Gardens in Bavaria
1977 establishments in West Germany